The Sound of Silence is a 1968 studio album by Carmen McRae for Atlantic Records with an orchestra primarily under the musical direction of Shorty Rogers. The first four tracks, recorded on June 26, 1968, were arranged and conducted by Jimmy Jones.

Track listing

Reception

Personnel
Carmen McRae - vocals
Shorty Rogers - arranger, musical director (except tracks 2, 4, 5, 11) 
Jimmy Jones  - arranger, conductor (2, 4, 5, 11)
Buddy Childers, Jack Sheldon, Jimmy Zito - trumpet
Dick Nash, Lew McCreary - trombone
Vincent DeRosa - French horn
Jim Horn, John Lowe - saxophones
Norman Simmons - electric piano, piano
Mike Deasy - guitar
Tommy Tedesco - guitar
Francois Vaz - guitar
Al Hendrickson - guitar
Max Bennett - bass
Bob West - bass
James Gordon - drums
Paul Humphrey - drums
Emil Radocchia - percussion
Larry Bunker - percussion

References

1968 albums
Carmen McRae albums
Atlantic Records albums
Albums arranged by Shorty Rogers